Psiloptera is a genus of beetles in the family Buprestidae, containing the following species:

 Psiloptera acroptera (Pongrácz, 1935)
 Psiloptera anilis Gistel, 1857
 Psiloptera argyrophora (Perty, 1830)
 Psiloptera assimilis (Gory, 1840)
 Psiloptera attenuata (Fabricius, 1793)
 Psiloptera bicarinata (Thunberg, 1789)
 Psiloptera cribrosa (Gory, 1840)
 Psiloptera ectinogonioides Cobos, 1963
 Psiloptera equestris (Olivier, 1790)
 Psiloptera fasciata (Haupt, 1950)
 Psiloptera fulgida (Olivier, 1790)
 Psiloptera haupti Weidlich, 1987
 Psiloptera hoffmanni (Laporte & Gory, 1836)
 Psiloptera incerta Weidlich, 1987
 Psiloptera johanni Lotte, 1940
 Psiloptera kerremansella Obenberger, 1926
 Psiloptera maculata (Haupt, 1950)
 Psiloptera malleri Cobos, 1969
 Psiloptera nattereri Redtenbacher, 1868
 Psiloptera olivieri Saunders, 1870
 Psiloptera orbignyi Lucas, 1859
 Psiloptera ornata (Haupt, 1956)
 Psiloptera pardalis (Laporte & Gory, 1836)
 Psiloptera pertyi (Laporte & Gory, 1836)
 Psiloptera puncticollis (Haupt, 1956)
 Psiloptera reichei (Laporte & Gory, 1836)
 Psiloptera rubromarginata Chevrolat, 1838
 Psiloptera schulzi (Haupt, 1950)
 Psiloptera signata (Haupt, 1950)
 Psiloptera transversovittata (Haupt, 1950)

References

Buprestidae genera